Anarchy Comics is a series of underground comic books published by Last Gasp between 1978 and 1987, as part of the underground comix subculture of the era. Edited by Jay Kinney (#1-3) and Paul Mavrides (#4), regular contributors to Anarchy Comics included Melinda Gebbie, Clifford Harper, and Spain Rodriguez, as well as Kinney and Mavrides. (Kinney, Mavrides, and Rodriguez had been noted for "adding new dimensions to the political comic" in the underground comix press of the 1970s and '80s.)

Publication history
A total of four issues of Anarchy Comics were published between 1978 and 1987, with individual issues appearing in 1978, 1979, 1981, and 1987. Each issue of Anarchy Comics was created by an international cast of anarchist or sympathetic contributors. Each issue included a mixture of fiction, history, commentary, and artwork, with wide ranges in style and format.

Only the first issue remains in print. A collected edition titled Anarchy Comics: The Complete Collection was published in December 2012 by PM Press.

Contributors
Each issue of Anarchy Comics showcased an international cast of artists who identified as anarchists or nonsectarian socialists. An example of this is Spain Rodriguez, a Marxist, who was considered of "sufficient libertarian bent" to be included.

List of contributors
The following is a list of each contributor in alphabetical order.

Themes

Anarchism

Overtly anarchist in its bent, all content included was based on anarchist philosophy and history. The humor of each anthology was satirical in nature, mocking both mainstream culture as well as traditional leftist ideas of revolution.

Punk rock
Roger Sabin, an English historian of comics and subculture, noted a number of connections between the comic and the Punk rock subculture of the '70s, suggesting that Jay Kinney "clearly hoped to pick up a share of the punk market with this very political comic." The covers of issues No.2 and No.3 both feature archetypal "punk" characters, and issue No. 2 features the short comic "Kultur Documents", a punk rock parody of Archie Comics. Sabin also analyzes "Too Real", Jay Kinney's short comic from the first issue, as being jointly inspired by a combination of Situationist and punk rock imagery. Sabin noted that many of the comics didn't have any relationship to Punk culture, but thought that the comic may have introduced radical ideas to a generation of new, young punks.

Issues 

"Too Real" by Jay Kinney
"Nestor Makhno" by Spain Rodriguez (originally published in T.R.A.; 1976)
"Smarmy Comics" by Jay Kinney
"The Quilting Bee" by Melinda Gebbie
"Blood and Sky" by Spain Rodriguez
"Gilbert Shelton's Advanced International Motoring Tips" by Gilbert Shelton
"Liberty Through The Ages" by Epistolier and Volny, with translation by Berangere Lomont (originally published in L'Echo Des Savanes No.29; 1977)
"What's The Difference" by J.R. Burnham
"Owd Nancy's Petticoat" by Clifford Harper
"Safehouse" by Dohrn
"On Contradiction" by M. Tsetung
"Today's Rhetoric" by 'Spud' Silber
"Some Straight Talk About Anarchy" by Paul Mavrides

See also

Anarchism and the arts
Anarky — DC Comics supervillain
 Leonard Rifas — cartoonist, editor, and publisher focused on similar themes
Trashman — comics character with Marxist-anarchist overtones, created by Spain Rodriguez

References

External links
Anarchy Comics, distributed by AK Press.
Anarchy Comics: The Complete Collection, published by PM Press.

1978 comics debuts
1987 comics endings
Anarchist comics
Anarchist fiction
Comics magazines published in the United States
Last Gasp titles
Underground comix